Ego Trip may refer to:

Ego trip (magazine), a 1990s hip hop magazine
Ego Trip (film), a 1969 film
Ego Trip (Kurtis Blow album), 1984
Ego Trip (Papa Roach album), 2022
 Ego Trip (Sikter album), 2009
Dexter's Laboratory: Ego Trip, a 1999 animated television movie based on the animated series Dexter's Laboratory
 "Ego Trip", a song by Mushroomhead from the album Mushroomhead

See also
 Egotrip (disambiguation)
 Ego Tripping (disambiguation)